Aidan O'Connor is a former Fine Gael member of Seanad Éireann. In June 1997, he was nominated by the Taoiseach, John Bruton as member of the outgoing 20th Seanad, serving until the elections in August 1997 for the 21st Seanad.

References

Year of birth missing (living people)
Living people
Fine Gael senators
Members of the 20th Seanad
Nominated members of Seanad Éireann